Klaus Winter (29 May 1936 in Essen – 10 October 2000) was a German judge. He studied legal science in Frankfurt. He was a justice of the Federal Constitutional Court of Germany.

20th-century German judges
Justices of the Federal Constitutional Court
1936 births
2000 deaths
20th-century German lawyers